The Clackline to Miling railway branch, originally known as the Clackline to Newcastle railway line, is a railway line in Western Australia.

The line developed progressively over the years and as it did so, various sections were named differently.  Each section of the line needed separate lobbying and discussion in the Western Australian Parliament to get enabling acts.  The final section was approved in 1920 and completed in 1925.

After completion it became known as the Miling branch, following final expansion north to Miling, and the closing of the Clackline to Newcastle (Toodyay) section.

Clackline to Newcastle (Toodyay) (now closed) 
The railway line to connect Newcastle to the eastern railway was considered to be best started from Clackline, rather than Northam. The original terminus of the line in the 1890s was a platform, it was later that the second stopping place properly known as Toodyay railway station was completed after the extension to Newcastle-Bolgart Railway was completed.

Following the construction of the standard gauge railway through the Avon valley in the 1960s, the connection with Clackline was no longer needed, and was closed with other former eastern railway connections in February 1966.

It is now a heritage trail.

Newcastle to Bolgart

Toodyay to Miling
In the 1960s the railway line from Toodyay to Miling was altered by the construction of the Eastern Railway through the Avon Valley, through Toodyay and a connection with Northam.

Tier system
The fate of the railway has been put in question due to the separation of wheatbelt railway lines being designated into specific tiers.

Stages of opening
The railway line was developed over time, the construction taking fifteen years to travel over 100 km.
 Clackline – Newcastle            January 1888    23.1 km
 Newcastle – Bolgart             December 1909    37.0 km
 Bolgart – Calingiri                 May  1917    23.2 km
 Calingiri – Piawaning               June 1919    30.4 km
 Piawanning – Miling               August 1925    43.8 km

Stopping places
Names used as found in WAGR Annual reports in the 1950s
 Clackline – Newcastle line
 Clackline
 Lawnswood
 Nanamoolan
 Hoodys Well
 Ringa
 Key Farm
 Lloyds crossing
 Newcastle / Toodyay
 Newcastle – Bolgart line 
 Lunns landing
 Coondle
 Dewars Pool
 Culham
 Bejoording
 Wattening
 Bolgart
 Bolgart – Miling line
 Wyening
 Calcarra
 Calingiri
 Carani
 Yerecoin
 Piawaning
 Gabalong
 Bindi Bindi
 Lyons Camp
 Miling

2019 derailments 
The line has had derailments in 2019.

Notes

Closed railway lines in Western Australia
Toodyay, Western Australia